Janet Perry (born December 27, 1947, Minneapolis) is an American operatic soprano. In 1959, aged 11, she was seen in a stage-version of The Wizard of Oz at the St Paul Civic Opera. Following high school, she matriculated at the Curtis Institute of Music, under the tutelage of Mme Eufemia Giannini-Gregory. 

Having earned her Bachelor of Music, she left for Europe where she debuted at the Linz Opera as Zerlina in Don Giovanni in 1969. In subsequent seasons, Perry was featured in most of the continent's major opera houses (including La Scala, 1978), as well as most of its famed festivals, including those of Salzburg, Glyndebourne, Aix-en-Provence, and Bregenz.

A particular favorite of Herbert von Karajan, she also sang under Carlos Kleiber, Karl Böhm, Riccardo Muti, Daniel Barenboim, Nikolaus Harnoncourt, Mstislav Rostropovich, Rafael Kubelík, James Levine and Wolfgang Sawallisch, as well as the stage directors Jean-Pierre Ponnelle and Giorgio Strehler.

Abridged discography
 Smetana: The Bartered Bride [as Esmeralda] {in German} (Stratas, Kollo; Krombholc, 1975) Eurodisc
 Verdi: Falstaff [as Nannetta] (Kabaivanska, Ludwig, Araiza, Taddei; Karajan, 1980) Philips
 Mozart: Die Zauberflöte [as Papagena] (Mathis, Ott, Araiza, van Dam; Karajan, 1980) Deutsche Grammophon
 Mozart: Thamos, König in Ägypten (Harnoncourt, 1980) Teldec
 Mozart: Great Mass in C minor (Hendricks, Schreier, Luxon; Karajan, 1982) Deutsche Grammophon
 R. Strauss: Der Rosenkavalier [as Sophie] (Tomowa-Sintow, Baltsa, Moll; Karajan, 1982) Deutsche Grammophon
 Beethoven: Ninth Symphony (Baltsa, Cole, van Dam; Karajan, 1983) Deutsche Grammophon
 Bruckner: "Te Deum" (Karajan, 1984) Deutsche Grammophon
 Mercadante: Il bravo (Aprea, 1990) [live] Nuova Era

Abridged videography
 Mozart: Le nozze di Figaro [as Barbarina] (Freni, Te Kanawa, Ewing, Prey, Fischer-Dieskau; Böhm, Ponnelle, 1976) Deutsche Grammophon
 Monteverdi: Il ritorno d'Ulisse in patria [as Melanto] (Hollweg, Schmidt, Araiza, Estes; Harnoncourt, Ponnelle, 1979) Deutsche Grammophon
 Monteverdi: L'incoronazione di Poppea [as Drusilla] (Yakar, Schmidt, Esswood, Tappy, Araiza, Salminen; Harnoncourt, Ponnelle, 1980) Deutsche Grammophon
 Verdi: Falstaff (Kabaivanska, Ludwig, Araiza, Taddei; Karajan, Karajan, 1982) [live] Sony
 J. S. Bach: Kaffeekantate (Schreier, Holl; Harnoncourt, 1984) [live] Deutsche Grammophon
 R. Strauss: Der Rosenkavalier (Tomowa-Sintow, Baltsa, Moll; Karajan, Karajan, 1984) [live] Sony
 J. Strauss II: Die Fledermaus [as Adele] (Coburn, Faßbaender, Hopferwieser, Wächter; Kleiber, Schenk, 1987) [live] Deutsche Grammophon

References

External links
 .

American operatic sopranos
Curtis Institute of Music alumni
Living people
1947 births
Musicians from Minneapolis
Singers from Minnesota
Classical musicians from Minnesota
21st-century American women